Jerry Wayne Smith (born December 31, 1960) is an American soccer coach who is currently head coach of the women's soccer program at Santa Clara University.

Coaching career

Collegiate
Smith began his coaching career in 1980 as head boys' soccer coach at his alma mater Homestead High School in Cupertino, California, where he was head coach for seven seasons. From 1982 to 1986, he was men's soccer assistant coach at Foothill College in nearby Los Altos and was head women's soccer coach at Foothill in 1986.

After completing his bachelor's degree in kinesiology at California State University, Hayward in 1986, Smith became the head coach at Santa Clara University in 1987. In 2001, he coached the Broncos to its first NCAA Division I Women's Soccer Championship after defeating 17-time champion North Carolina 1–0. He has coached the team to 10 West Coast Conference titles and 24 NCAA tournaments.

International
In 2001, Smith was named head coach of the United States women's national under-21 soccer team.

Head coaching record
Sources:

Personal life
Smith is married to Brandi Chastain; they have a son, Jaden Chastain Smith, born in June 2006. Smith also has a son from a previous relationship, Cameron Smith.

See also
 List of college women's soccer coaches with 300 wins

References

External links
 Santa Clara coach profile 
 

1960 births
Living people
American soccer coaches
College men's soccer coaches in the United States
Santa Clara Broncos women's soccer coaches
People from Cupertino, California
California State University, East Bay alumni
High school soccer coaches in the United States
Sportspeople from Santa Clara County, California
Foothill Owls men's soccer coaches